Dumitra is a commune in Bistrița-Năsăud County, Transylvania, Romania. It is composed of three villages: Cepari, Dumitra and Tărpiu.

Natives
Gerhard Poschner

References

Communes in Bistrița-Năsăud County
Localities in Transylvania